Anne McAlpine (née Morrison; previously Lundon) is a Scottish journalist, newsreader and weather presenter working for BBC Alba and BBC Scotland. She is best known for presenting Reporting Scotland and Landward, and narrating Scotland's Home of the Year. 

McAlpine additionally presents many Scottish Gaelic-language programmes, including Èorpa, An Là, An Cuan Sgith (The Minch), and An t-Uisge/Rain stories.

Early life and education 
McAlpine was brought up as the youngest of four girls in a tight-knit Scottish Gaelic-speaking community on the Isle of Lewis in the Outer Hebrides of Scotland. Her father works as a mechanic, while her mother cared for the family at home. From a young age, McAlpine took a keen interest in music, playing the chanter and bagpipes until 14 when she sustained a mouth injury. She then took up the piano, which she continues to play. After attempting a law degree in Glasgow, McAlpine graduated from the University of the Highlands and Islands with a degree in Gaelic language and culture, which got her into Gaelic broadcasting.

Career

BBC 
Anne McAlpine first began her broadcasting career as a contributor to the Scottish Gaelic-language BBC programme Dè a-Nis?, which she enjoyed. McAlpine realised her aim of becoming a Gaelic newsreader at this stage, and continued to progress her career with independent MNE Media.

With the emergence of BBC Alba, McAlpine became a main presenter of the European current affairs programme Eòrpa, as well as taking on roles presenting various other programmes including An Là and the Scottish Gaelic-language weather.  

As the broadcaster's career progressed, she became an English-language presenter for late bulletins of Reporting Scotland on Wednesday, Thursday, and Friday, as well as for BBC Scotland's rural affairs programme Landward. Since 2019, McAlpine has narrated Scotland's Home of the Year. 

On radio, McAlpine hosts the Gaelic-language drive time show Aithris an Fheasgair on BBC Radio nan Gàidheal three times a week.  

Anne McAlpine has fronted several of her own shows for BBC Alba. In 2017, McAlpine toured the North Coast 500 in a Volkswagen Beetle for her programme North Coast 500 - Le Anne Lundon. In 2021, she presented An Cuan Sgith (The Minch), a six-part series produced for BBC Alba in which The Minch, a strait separating mainland Scotland and the western isles, is explored. McAlpine similarly presented An t-Uisge/Rain Stories, a BBC Alba series discovering the influence of rain in culture and tradition in 2022.

McAlpine is based at BBC Scotland's headquarters known as Pacific Quay in Glasgow.

Other activities 
In 2007, McAlpine represented the Western Isles in football as a defender at the 2007 Island Games in Rhodes, Greece.

Personal life 
Anne has been married twice.  First to David Lundon and more recently, in February 2022 to Ken McAlpine, a cameraman whom she met working on Èorpa. They live together in Glasgow near Kelvingrove Park, though McAlpine returns home regularly.

References

External links 
 Anne McAlpine on Twitter
 Anne McAlpine on Instagram

Scottish television presenters
Scottish women television presenters
Scottish women journalists
Scottish journalists
Weather presenters
Living people
Year of birth missing (living people)